The 1982 Espirito Santo Trophy took place 8–11 October at Geneva Golf Club in Geneva, Switzerland. It was the tenth women's golf World Amateur Team Championship for the Espirito Santo Trophy. The tournament was a 72-hole stroke play team event with 28 teams, each with up to three players. The best two scores for each round counted towards the team total.

The United States team won the Trophy, defending the title from two years ago and winning their eighth title, beating team New Zealand by seven strokes. New Zealand earned the silver medal while the combined team of Great Britain and Ireland took the bronze on third place another two strokes behind.

Teams 
26 teams contested the event. Each team had three players, except the team representing Portugal, which only had two.

Results 

Sources:

Individual leaders 
There was no official recognition for the lowest individual scores.

References

External links 
World Amateur Team Championships on International Golf Federation website

Espirito Santo Trophy
Golf tournaments in Switzerland
Espirito Santo Trophy
Espirito Santo Trophy
Espirito Santo Trophy